The Stockholm Resilience Centre (SRC), is a research centre on resilience and sustainability science at Stockholm University.  It is a joint initiative between Stockholm University and the Beijer Institute of Ecological Economics at the Royal Swedish Academy of Sciences.

The centre states that its mission  is to:

 advance the scientific understanding of the complex, dynamic interactions of people and nature in the Biosphere
 train the next generation of sustainability researchers and leaders
 engage in collaborations with change agents

The SRC has a particular focus on social-ecological resilience, where humans and nature are studied as an integrated whole. The centre advises policymakers and industry on ecosystem management and long-term sustainable and equitable development in Europe and elsewhere around the world.

Organisation 
The centre is governed by a board with additional strategic advice provided by two international boards. There is a scientific advisory council of leading sustainability researchers to provide advice on scientific development of the centre, which includes researchers such as Rashid Sumaila, Frances Westley, Marten Scheffer, Elke Weber, Jessica Fanzo and Elena Bennett. There is also an international advisory board that provides strategic advice to the centre in its efforts to have global impact within science, business, policy and practice.

The SRC has approximately 140 staff, of which about 90 are post-PhD researchers. Line Gordon is director of the centre. The centre has many productive and influential researchers. In 2019, five if its researchers, co-founders Carl Folke and Johan Rockström together with Oonsie Biggs, Stephan Barthel and Per Olsson were recognised as highly cited researchers in their field. In 2020, researchers Örjan Bodin, Thomas Elmqvist, and Garry Peterson also joined this list, meaning eight of the centre's researchers were highly cited.

Research 
Stockholm Resilience Centre consists of six focus areas which concentrate research on specific angles of sustainability science, resilience and social-ecological systems:

 The human ocean focus area engages in new and emerging research frontiers for a more sustainable and equitable future for the ocean.
 The food for resilience focus area studies the prerequisites for and pathways to sustainable and resilient global food systems.
 The Anthropocene dynamics focus area explores how global biophysical and socioeconomic dynamics emerge, interact, and shape the relationships between humans and nature, and what the social and environmental consequences are.
 The resilience and sustainable development focus area addresses the challenges and the diversity of trajectories associated with sustainable development for all in the context of the Anthropocene.
 The interacting complexities focus area explores how to address complex sustainability challenges by drawing on different complexity perspectives.
 The stewardship and transformative futures focus area explores the knowledge systems, values, meanings, practices, behaviours, and governance arrangements that can contribute to fair and just sustainable futures.

Education 
Along with a PhD programme in Sustainability Science SRC also operates a Masters programme in Social-Ecological Resilience for Sustainable Development and a number of specialised courses, such as its executive programme in resilience thinking aimed at CEOs and chairpersons and a number of Stockholm University courses focused on global change, sustainable business, social-ecological resilience and systems theory.

Notable work

The Planetary Boundaries 
In 2009, Stockholm Resilience Centre's then director Johan Rockström led an international group of 28 leading academics, who proposed a new Earth system framework, the "planetary boundaries", for government and management agencies as a precondition for sustainable development. The framework posits that Earth system processes on the planet have boundaries or thresholds that should not be crossed. The extent to which these boundaries are not crossed marks what the group calls the safe operating space for humanity. The group identified nine "planetary life support systems" essential for human survival and attempted to quantify just how far seven of these systems have been pushed already. They then estimated how much further we could go before our survival is threatened; beyond these boundaries, there is a risk of "irreversible and abrupt environmental change" which could make Earth less habitable. Boundaries can help identify where there is room and define a "safe space for human development", which is an improvement on approaches that aim to minimize human impacts on the planet.

In 2015, the scientists published an update. They changed the name of the boundary "loss of biodiversity" to "change in biosphere integrity" meaning that not only the number of species but also the functioning of the biosphere as a whole is important, and "chemical pollution" to "novel entities," including in it not only pollution but also organic pollutants, radioactive materials, nanomaterials, and microplastics. According to the 2015 update, four of the boundaries have been exceeded: climate change, loss of biosphere integrity, land-system change and altered biogeochemical cycles (phosphorus and nitrogen). By now, the concept of planetary boundaries had gained significant international media attention and was covered in, among others, the Economist and National Geographic.

In 2019, scientists announced efforts to quantify the novel entities and aerosols boundaries. In 2022, they concluded that the novel entity boundary has been exceeded.

Development studies scholars have been critical of aspects of the framework, arguing that its adoption could place on the Global South. Proposals to conserve a certain proportion of Earth's remaining forests can be seen as rewarding the countries such as those in Europe that have already economically benefitted from exhausting their forests and converting land for agriculture. In contrast, countries that have yet to industrialize are asked to make sacrifices for global environmental damage they may have had little role in creating.

Breaking Boundaries documentary 
In 2021 Netflix released the documentary film Breaking Boundaries: the Science of Our Planet, directed by Jonathan Clay and presented by Sir David Attenborough and Johan Rockström. The 75-minute production follows the scientific journey of Rockström and his team's discovery of the nine planetary boundaries. Alongside the film's release, a book of the same name was published, with a foreword from Greta Thunberg.

The Planetary Health Diet 
The Planetary Health Diet is a flexitarian diet developed by the EAT-Lancet Commission as part of a report released in The Lancet on 16 January 2019. Stockholm Resilience Centre was the scientific coordinator of the report.

The aim of the planetary health diet is to create new dietary paradigms to:

 Feed a world's population of 10 billion people in 2050
 Greatly reduce the worldwide number of deaths caused by poor diet
 Be environmentally sustainable as to prevent the collapse of the natural world

The report promotes diets consisting of a variety of plant-based foods, with low amounts of animal-based foods, refined grains, highly processed foods, and added sugars, and with unsaturated rather than saturated fats.

While the report received significant media coverage, including features in the Guardian, CNN and BBC, it was also criticized on social media for advocating eating less meat. Later on, it was found that this critique was part of a concerted campaign started by pro-meat advocates a few days ahead of the launch of the report.

Other 

 Stockholm Resilience Centre is the co-founder and a scientific partner of SeaBOS, a partnership between the world's ten largest seafood companies that aims to make the industry more sustainable.
 The centre has hosted two international science conferences on resilience and sustainability in 2008 and 2017.
 In 2011 it hosted the third Nobel Laureate Symposium on global sustainability together with the Royal Swedish  Academy of Sciences, Stockholm Environment Institute, the Beijer Institute of Ecological Economics, and the Potsdam Institute for Climate Impact Research.
 In 2021 the first Nobel Prize Summit was hosted by the Nobel Foundation and organised by the US National Academy of Sciences in partnership with the Potsdam Institute for Climate Impact Research and Stockholm Resilience Centre/Beijer Institute of Ecological Economics.

Specialist programmes 
 Global Resilience Partnership
 SwedBio

References 



Research institutes in Sweden
Environmental research institutes